Hemanthias is a genus of colourful marine ray-finned fish in the subfamily Anthiinae, part of the family Serranidae, the groupers and sea basses.

They are red, pink and yellow, and reach  in length depending on the species.

Species
Based on FishBase, the following species are included in Hemanthias:

 Hemanthias leptus (Longley, 1935) (Longtail bass) - West Atlantic
 Hemanthias peruanus (Steindachner, 1875) (Splittail bass) – East Pacific
 Hemanthias signifer (Garman, 1899) (Damsel bass)– East Pacific

References

Anthiinae